Bahram Dabbagh (born July 24, 1992) is an Iranian football midfielder, who currently plays for Nassaji Mazandaran in the Azadegan League.

Career
Dabbagh joined Paykan in 2012.

Club career statistics

International career

U 17
Dabbagh played  Iran national under-17 football team winning the Asian U-16 Championship in 2008 starting 5 of the six games.

U 19
He was again a vital part of Iran's U19's participating at the 2010 AFC U-19 Championship, he played in Iran's first to games, Iran losing both and failing to qualify from its group.

U 22
He was called up by Ali Reza Mansourian to participate in the team's training camp in Italy.

References

External links
Bahram Dabbagh at PersianLeague.com

Iranian footballers
Association football midfielders
Tractor S.C. players
Paykan F.C. players
Naft Tehran F.C. players
1992 births
Living people
People from Azarshahr
Iran under-20 international footballers